Hunger Hill may refer to:

 Hunger Hill, Cheshire, England
 Hunger Hill, Greater Manchester, England
 Hunger Hill, Lancashire, England, a village in the parish of Wrightington

See also
 Hungry Hill (disambiguation)